Chinese armour was predominantly lamellar from the Warring States period (481 BC–221 BC) onward, prior to which animal parts such as rhinoceros hide, rawhide, and turtle shells were used for protection. Lamellar armour was supplemented by scale armour since the Warring States period or earlier. Partial plate armour was popular from the Northern and Southern dynasties (420–589), and mail and mountain pattern armour from the Tang dynasty (618–907). Chain mail had been known since the Han Dynasty, but did not see widespread production or battlefield use, and may have seen as "exotic foreign armor" used as a display of wealth for wealthier officers and soldiers. During the Ming dynasty (1368–1644), brigandine began to supplant lamellar armour and was used to a great degree into the Qing dynasty (1644–1912). By the 19th century most Qing armour, which was of the brigandine type, were purely ceremonial, having kept the outer studs for aesthetic purposes, and omitted the protective metal plates.

Ancient armour

Shang dynasty (c. 1600 BC–c. 1046 BC)
The earliest archaeological evidence of armour in China dates to the Shang dynasty. These were either breastplates made of shell tied together or a one-piece rawhide or leather breastplate. Helmets were made of bronze and often sported elaborate designs consisting of animal motifs. Armour was almost exclusively for nobles; regular folks had little to no protection and more commonly used a hide covered shield made of wood or bamboo.

Zhou dynasty (c. 1046 BC–256 BC)
Armour in the Zhou dynasty consisted of either a sleeveless coat of rhinoceros or buffalo hide, or leather scale armour. Helmets were largely similar to Shang predecessors but less ornate. Chariot horses were sometimes protected by tiger skins.

Warring States (c. 475 BC–221 BC)

In the 4th century BC, rhinoceros armour was still used. In the following passage Guan Zhong advises Duke Huan of Qi to convert punishments to armour and weapons:

By the late Warring States period in the 3rd century BC, iron weapons and armour had come into widespread use.

Lamellar armour

Lamellar armour of leather (more appropriately considered untanned or superficially tanned rawhide), bronze and iron appeared by the mid-4th century BC. It consisted of individual armour pieces (lamellae, lamella singular) that were either riveted or laced together to form a suit of armour. Iron helmets constructed with multiple lamellae began to replace the one piece bronze helmets of old. One sample discovered in Yi county, Hebei Province was composed of 89 lamellae, averaging 5 cm x 4 cm.

In the 3rd century BC, both iron weapons and armour became more common. According to the Xunzi, "the hard iron spears of Wan (宛) [a city in Chu, near modern Nanyang (南陽), Henan] are as cruel as wasps and scorpions." Iron weapons also gave Chinese armies an edge over barbarians. Han Fei recounts that during a battle with the Gonggong (共工) tribe, "the iron-tipped lances reached the enemy, and those without strong helmets and armour were injured." The effectiveness of bronze axes and shields may have been superseded by new iron weaponry and armor. The efficiency of crossbows however outpaced any progress in defensive armour. It was considered a common occurrence in ancient China for commoners or peasants to kill a lord with a well aimed crossbow bolt, regardless of whatever armour he might have been wearing at the time.

The heaviest and most protective armours were often restricted to elite soldiers, though each state distributed armour in their own ways. The state of Chu favoured elite armoured crossbow units known for their endurance, and were capable of marching 160 km 'without resting.' Wei's elite forces were capable of marching over 40 km in one day while wearing heavy armour, a large crossbow with 50 bolts, a helmet, a side sword, and three days worth of rations. Those who met these standards earned an exemption from corvée labor and taxes for their entire family. By the time of the Qin Dynasty, approximately half the soldiers could be equipped with some form of heavy armor as indicated by the Terracotta Army.

According to Su Qin, the state of Han made the best weapons, capable of cleaving through the strongest armour, shields, leather boots and helmets. Their soldiers wore iron facemasks.

The state of Wu divided its army into three sections. The main army wore plain armour, the army of the left wore lacquered red armour, and the army of the right wore black armour.

By the end of the 3rd century BC at least a few horsemen wore armour of some kind.

Qin armour

The Qin calculated fines for more severe crimes in terms of one or two coats of armour, lower crimes in terms of shields, and the lowest in terms of coins. Qin soldiers sometimes threw off their armour in a kind of berserk rage and engaged in fanatical charges. Qin armour usually used rectangular lamellae with dimensions of 7.5 cm x 8.5 cm and 10.5 cm x 7.8 cm. Dimensions of lamellae used for charioteer armour varies between the upper body, lower body, and arms. Lamellae on the upper body were 7 cm x 6 cm, the lower body 9 cm x 6.5 cm, and arms 4–7.5 cm x 4 cm. Lamellae on cavalrymen were 8 cm x 5.7 cm. A complete set of Qin armour, judging by the finds in the Terracotta Army consisted of 250 to 612 pieces in total, not including the helmet.

Six groups of armour have been identified in the Terracotta Army corresponding to rank and military division. Some soldiers are outfitted with little to no armour at all, cavalrymen with armour that covered the chest, charioteers with longer armour, armed infantry with armour covering the torso and shoulders, low-ranking officers with armour using large lamellae, middle-ranking officers with shorter armour covering the torso and waist or just the breast, but with decorations such as ribbons, and generals with a distinctive coat showing torso armour and ribbons to signify their status. None of the terracotta soldiers have been found wearing a helmet or holding a shield. However, this may be because the terracotta soldiers are simulating a funerary procession for their ruler, and according to protocol, subordinates had to remove their helmets when appearing before the emperor. Helmets have been found in other excavated pits near the terracotta soldiers. Furthermore, another explanation for both the lack of both weapons and helmets for the terracotta army is that most of the functional, usable equipment made for the terracotta army were believed to have been looted during the rebellion against the Qin dynasty.

There is some evidence that armour for horses might have existed for Qin cavalry judging by 300 lamellae too large for human use.

Han dynasty (206 BC–220 AD)

Han dynasty armour was largely the same as the Qin dynasty with minor variations. Infantry wore suits of lacquered rawhide, hardened and lacquered leather [or partially tanned rawhide?], or iron [or iron alloys such as steel] lamellar armour and caps or iron helmets. A suit of iron armour dating to the Western Han period consisted of 328 lamellae pieces. Some riders wore armour and carried shields and some horses were armored. However, more widespread and more comprehensive horse armour is not attested to until the late 2nd century.

During the late 2nd century BC, the government created a monopoly on the ironworks, which may have caused a decrease in quality of iron and armour. Bu Shi claimed that the resulting products were inferior because they were made to meet quotas rather than for practical use. These monopolies as debated in the Discourses on Salt and Iron were abolished by the beginning of the 1st century AD. In 150 AD, Cui Shi made similar complaints about the issue of quality control in government production due to corruption: "...not long thereafter the overseers stopped being attentive, and the wrong men have been promoted by Imperial decree. Greedy officers fight over the materials, and shifty craftsmen cheat them... Iron [i.e. steel] is quenched in vinegar, making it brittle and easy to... [?] The suits of armour are too small and do not fit properly."

Composite bows were considered effective against unarmoured enemies at 165 yards, and against armoured opponents at 65 yards.

Hook shield
During the Han dynasty, a hook shield was used in combination with a sword when fighting against polearms. The hook shield was a small iron shield that had hooks at the top and bottom for hooking halberds or spears. Sometimes it had a thorny protrusion in the middle for attacking.

Three Kingdoms (220–280)

By the Three Kingdoms period many cavalrymen wore armour and some horses were equipped with their own armour as well. In one battle, the warlord Cao Cao boasted that with only ten sets of horse armour he had faced an enemy with three hundred sets. The horse armour may however have just been metal partial frontal barding or a mixture of metal and rawhide barding rather than fully comprehensive all metal barding.

References to "great shields" occur in their usage on the front line to protect spearmen and crossbowmen. Shields were also commonly paired with the single edged dao and used among cavalrymen. Descriptions of the Battle of Guandu mention that Cao Cao's soldiers employed shield cover above their heads each time they moved out into the open due to oppressive arrow fire from Yuan Shao's wooden towers.

Dark armour
A report in 231 AD mentions the capture of 5,000 suits of "dark armour" (xuan kai or xuan jia 玄鎧/玄甲) and 3,100 crossbows. Dark armour appears in Han texts as well, but only as the attire worn by honor guards at funeral processions. The only trait known about dark armour is that it reflected the sun's rays. This probably means dark armour was made of high quality steel, which was often associated with black ferrous material.

Brilliant armour
Cao Zhi mentioned three different kinds of armour, two of which were variants of "brilliant" armour:

Brilliant armour was made of decarburized steel, which shines blue-black when polished, giving it its name. Chen Lin described brilliant armour in the following manner:

Jin dynasty and the Sixteen Kingdoms (265–439)

Fully comprehensive metal horse armour covering the horse's entire body appeared in northeastern China in the mid-4th century during the Eastern Jin dynasty, probably as a result of Xianbei influence. By the end of the 4th century, murals depicting horse armour covering the entire body were found in tombs as far as Yunnan.

Sources mention the capture of thousands of "armored horses" in a single battle.

Five colored armour
Shi Hu's bodyguard was said to have worn "fine five-colored armour" (wuse xikai), which was so dazzling it blinded the eye. This was probably similar in construction to brilliant armour.

Northern and Southern dynasties (420–589)

Cord and plaque
During the Northern and Southern dynasties period (420–589), a style of armour called "cord and plaque" became popular, as did shields and long swords. "Cord and plaque" armour consisted of double breast plates in the front and back held together, sometimes on a frame, by two shoulder straps and waist cords, worn over the usual lamellar armour. "Cord and plaque" wearing figurines are also often depicted holding an oval or rectangular shield and a long sword. Types of armour had also apparently become distinct enough for there to be separate categories for light and heavy armour.

Bright brilliant armour continued to be prominent. In 518 AD, the Northern Wei court gave a visiting Avar chieftain a set of fine bright brilliant cavalry armour and six sets of iron cavalry armour. Deployment of armoured cavalry was common for the Northern Wei, especially among the "iron-clad" Erzhu tribe who specialized in armoured cavalry. References to heavy cavalry as "iron horses" occur in the poetry of Lu Chui. In 543 AD, the Western Wei general Cai Yu came to be known as "iron tiger" for his distinctive bright brilliant armour.

The elite guards of the Liang dynasty (502–557) were equipped with helmets, uniforms, and armour that "trimmed in gold and silver and glistening under the sun's glare," cost in all some several hundred thousand coppers for each soldier. The display reportedly sapped the spirits of Jin warriors, although the Jin commander Zhou Dewei said they were "more intent on posing than engaging the enemy."

Banded armour
The earliest depictions of "banded" armour have been found in bronze figurines made by the Dian Kingdom that existed from 279 BCE to 109 BCE. Later banded armor also appears in Northern and Southern dynasties and Tang era art. This type of armour was built up of long horizontal bands or plates, similar to the lorica segmentata. The imperial guards of the Jurchen Jin dynasty have been described wearing banded armour. The left guards wore blue banded armour and held yellow dragon flags while the right guards wore red banded armour and held red dragon flags. Banded armour is even more rarely depicted than the elusive mountain pattern armour or mail armour.

Co-fusion steel weapons on armour
In the 6th century, Qimu Huaiwen introduced to Northern Qi the process of 'co-fusion' steel-making, which used metals of different carbon contents to create steel. Apparently sabers made using this method were capable of penetrating 30 armour lamellae. It's not clear if the armour was of iron or leather.

Medieval armour

Sui dynasty (581–618)

The Sui dynasty made prodigious use of heavy cavalry. Both men and horses were heavily armoured. Armoured Sui horsemen found it difficult to engage with lighter Turkic cavalry on the steppes. They were mainly used to break infantry formations.

The Book of Sui provides an account of the cavalry battalions of the dynasty's 24 armies. They first battalion wore "bright-brilliant" (mingguang) armour made of decarburized steel connected by dark green cords, their horses wore iron armour with dark green tassels, and they were distinguished by lion banners. The second battalion wore armour of vermillion leather joined with red cords, their horse armour had an animal pattern with red tassels, and their unit flag was a panther-like beast. Other battalions were also distinguished by their own colors, patterns, and flags, but neither the bright-brilliant armour or iron armour are mentioned.

Tang dynasty (618–907)

By the Tang dynasty it was possible for armour to provide immense personal protection. Heavy cavalry played an important role in the Tang army during the wars following the Sui dynasty's collapse. In one instance Li Shimin's cousin, Li Daoxuan, was able to cut his way through the entire enemy mass of Xia soldiers and then cut his way back again, repeating the operation several times before the battle was won, at which point he had so many arrows sticking out of his armour that he looked like a "porcupine." In another battle between Li Shimin and Wang Shichong, Li and his entourage of 500 armoured cavalry were attacked by a light cavalry force led by Shan Xiongxin. Shan charged at Li directly but was intercepted by one of Li's generals, Yuchi Gong, who knocked Shan off his horse. Yuchi then led the armoured cavalry force and broke through the enemy army while Li rallied his forces and drove through Shan's light cavalry several times. The arrows and spears of Wang's forces had little effect on Tang heavy cavalry. The effective range of a composite bow against armoured troops in this era was considered to be around 75 to 100 yards.

Li Shimin's elite cavalry forces were known to have worn distinctive black "iron clad" armour, and Li Shimin himself was said to have been able to forgo food for two days and keep armour on for three days, but heavy cavalry declined as Turkic influence became more prevalent and light cavalry became the dominant mode of mounted warfare. Tang expeditionary forces to Central Asia preferred a mixture of light and heavy Chinese horse archers. After the An Lushan rebellion of the mid-9th century and losing the northwestern pastures to the Tibetans, Chinese cavalry almost disappeared altogether as a relevant military force. Many southern horses were considered too small or frail to carry an armoured soldier.

Infantry armour became more common in the Tang era and roughly 60 percent of active soldiers were equipped with armour of some kind. Armour could be manufactured natively or captured as a result of war. For instance 10,000 suits of iron armour were captured during the Goguryeo–Tang War. Armour and mounts, including pack animals, were supplied by the state through state funds, and thus considered state property. Private ownership of military equipment such as horse armour, long lances, and crossbows was prohibited. Possession was taken as intent of rebellion or treason. The army staff kept track of armour and weapons with detailed records of items issued. If a deficiency was discovered, the corresponding soldier was ordered to pay restitution. The state also provided clothing and rations for border garrisons and expeditionary armies. Soldiers not on active duty were expected to pay for themselves, although "professional" soldiers were given tax exemptions.

Tang iron lamellae were between 9.6 and 9 cm long, 2.6 to 1.3 cm wide, and 0.28 to 0.22 cm thick.

Mail armour
Mail was already known to the Chinese since they first encountered it in 384 AD when their allies in the nation of Kuchi arrived wearing "armor similar to chains". However mail armour was not mentioned again until 718 AD when a tributary mission from Samarkand presented to the Tang emperor a coat of "link armour". Mail was later improved on during the Song dynasty to withstand arrows better, by which H. Russell Robinson believes meant using interlocked rings. However mail was never used in any significant numbers and was seen as foreign and exotic, originating from the Qiang people from the west. The dominant form of armour continued to be lamellar.

Mountain pattern armour
References to mountain pattern armour appear as early as the Tang dynasty in the Six Statutels of the Tang Dynasty, but historical texts provide no explanation or diagram of how it actually worked. There are also no surviving examples of it. Everything that is known about mountain pattern armour comes from paintings and statues, typically of the Song and Ming periods. It is not unique to China and has been found in depictions in Korea, Vietnam, Japan, and even Thailand, however non-religious depictions are limited to only China, Korea, and Vietnam. Reconstruction projects of this type of armour have largely failed to produce good results.
The current theory is that this type of armour is made from a multitude of small pieces of iron or steel shaped like the Chinese character for the word "mountain" (山). One theory is that they were zigzag lines of pointed scale heads similar to lamellar armour. The pieces are interlocked and riveted to a cloth or leather backing. It covers the torso, shoulders and thighs while remaining comfortable and flexible enough to allow movement. Also during this time, senior Chinese officers used mirror armour to protect important body parts, while cloth, leather, lamellar, and/or Mountain pattern armor were used for other body parts. This overall design was called "shining armor".

There is an alternative theory that mountain pattern armour is simply a result of very stylistic depictions of mail armour, but known depictions of mail armour in Chinese art do not match with mountain pattern armour either.

Five Dynasties and Ten Kingdoms (907–960)

Paper armour
During the wars between the Later Zhou and Southern Tang, civilians on the Tang side formed "White Armor Armies", named after the white paper armour they wore. These Tang civilian armies experienced some success in driving off small contingents of Zhou forces but avoided confrontation with the larger army. The White Armour militia army was later revived to fight against the Song dynasty, but they were ineffective and disbanded.

Later Ming texts provide descriptions of paper armour. One version was made of silk paper and functioned as a gambeson, worn under other armour or by itself. Silk paper could also be used for arm guards. Another version used thicker, more flexible paper, hammered soft, and fastened with studs. It's said that this type of paper armour performed better when soaked with water.

Paper armour was still worn by the Hui people in Yunnan in the late 19th century. Bark paper armour in layers of thirty to sixty sheets in addition to silk and cotton was considered to be fairly good protection against musket balls and bayonets, which got stuck in the layers of paper, but not breech loading rifles at close quarters.

Liao dynasty (907–1125)
The Khitans of the Liao dynasty employed heavy armoured cavalry as the core of their army. In battle they arrayed light cavalry in the front and two layers of armoured cavalry in the back. Even foragers were armoured. Units of Khitan heavy cavalry were organized in groups of 500 to 700 men. Unlike some other empires originating from nomadic tribes, the Khitans preferred to fight in dense heavy cavalry formations rather than the wide formations of horse archers.

Song dynasty (960–1279)

During the Song dynasty (960–1279) it became fashionable to create warts on pieces of armour to imitate cold forged steel, a product typically produced by non-Han people in modern Qinghai. Warts created from cold work were actually spots of higher carbon in the original steel, thus aesthetic warts on non-cold forged steel served no purpose. According to Shen Kuo, armour constructed of cold forged steel was impenetrable to arrows shot at a distance of 50 paces. Even if the arrow happened to hit a drill hole, the arrowhead was the one which was ruined. However crossbows were still prized for their ability to penetrate heavy armour.

The History of Song notes that Song "tools of war were exceedingly effective, never before seen in recent times," and "their weapons and armor were very good", but "their troops weren't always effective." According to Sima Guang, since most military problems came from the north, the military establishment in the south was neglected, leaving soldiers without armour and even cities without gates.

The Zhuang people of Nong Zhigao's army during the Nong Zhigao rebellions (1042, 1048, 1052) fought in units of three. One person held a large shield while the other two threw javelins.

Western Xia (1038–1227)

The Western Xia made modest use of heavy cavalry, of which it had 3,000 at its height.

Jurchen Jin dynasty (1115–1234)

The Jurchens had a reputation for making high quality armour and weapons. Both metal and quilted armour were worn by Jurchens. The Jurchen army was organized into units of a thousand and a hundred. Every hundred was composed of two fifty men social and economic units called punian. Each punian was supposed to have 20 men equipped with armour and lances or halberds. These 20 men formed a standard two rank five deep battle formation while the others formed three ranks of archers.

In 1232 the Jurchens used cast iron bombs against the Mongols at the siege of Kaifeng. The History of Jin states that the fire created by the blast could penetrate even iron armour.

Yuan dynasty (1271–1368)

According to Meng Hong, the reason for the Mongols' success was that they possessed more iron than previous steppe peoples.

Both Chinese and European sources concur that Mongols wore substantial armour capable of stopping arrows. A Song source notes that one way to pierce heavily clad Mongol warriors was to use small arrows capable of entering the eye slits of their helmet. According to Thomas the Archdeacon, Mongol arrows were capable of penetrating all known types of armour at the time, but their own leather armour could withstand the arrows of their enemies. However he also mentions that the Mongols feared crossbows.

Giovanni da Pian del Carpine describing Mongol lamellar armour:

Late imperial armour

Ming dynasty (1368–1644)

As the development of military industry saw rapid growth during the Ming dynasty as well as the need for greater defence especially around the northern borders.

Although armour never lost all meaning during the Ming dynasty, it became less and less important as the power of firearms became apparent. It was already acknowledged by the early Ming artillery officer Jiao Yu that guns "were found to behave like flying dragons, able to penetrate layers of armor." Fully armoured soldiers could and were killed by guns. The Ming Marshall Cai was one such victim. An account from the enemy side states, "Our troops used fire tubes to shoot and fell him, and the great army quickly lifted him and carried him back to his fortifications." It is possible that Chinese armour had some success in blocking musket balls later on during the Ming dynasty. A composite shield made of several layers of material known as the Duo Qian Fang Pai (Lead-catching defence shield) was specifically designed to stop bullets. According to the Japanese, during the Battle of Jiksan, the Chinese wore armour and used shields that were at least partially bulletproof. Frederick Coyett later described Ming lamellar armour as providing complete protection from "small arms", although this is sometimes mistranslated as "rifle bullets".

According to the Jixiao Xinshu, written in 1584, rattan shields were preferable to wooden shields in the south because they were lighter and easier to use in muddy and rainy conditions and on the sloped pathways of farming fields. Rattan shields were sometimes paired with javelins, which were used to distract the enemy. The writer considered the rattan shields ineffective against guns.

Rocket handlers often wore heavy armour for extra protection so that they could fire at close range.

Brigandine armour
Brigandine armour (bumianjia (Chinese: 布面甲; Pinyin: bùmiànjiǎ)) became the most dominant form of armour, particularly in the north, during the Ming and Qing era. It consisted of riveted plates covered with fabric. Popularly known as dingjia (nailed armour), it was actually called bumianjia (cloth covered armour). It was also sometimes called anjia (dark armour) in contrast to mingjia (bright armour) which referred to lamellar.

Plate armour
Partial plate armour in the form of a cuirass sewn together with fabric is mentioned in the Wubei Yaolue, 1638. Called quantiejia (complete metal armour), the text describes the usage of 100 catties of Fujian iron, 4–5 piculs of northern coal, and over 10 piculs of southern coal in the creation process of the plates. After finishing the plates, they were lacquered and linked together using cotton and woolen ropes. A full set of quantiejia weighed around 34.4 catties. One Ming catty was around 590 grams, making a full set of quantiejia around 20 kg in weight. It's not known how common plate armour was during the Ming dynasty, and no other source mentions it. There are no records of mail and plate used together from Chinese records but the Veritable Records of the Joseon Dynasty does mention the dismissal of an official for failing to supervise the production of "Chinese mail-and-plate armour" in the 15th century.

Leather armour
Leather armour was made using cowhide. The cowhide was cut into small scales, painted with tung oil, baked dry, and then hammered together with powdered iron. This process was repeated multiple times until each piece of leather scale hardened. The hardened scales were then laced together into a suit of armour. Another version of leather armour used by sailors in Guangdong and Guangxi cut the hides into bands that were riveted together horizontally. Soldiers recruited from the miners of Chuzhou used a type of leather armour that only protected the left side of the body. The lower part of the armour was suspended by a hook to allow for ease of movement. Aside from cowhide, leather armour could also be made from pangolin hides.

Qing dynasty (1636–1912)

In the 17th century the Qing army was equipped with both lamellar and brigandine armour. The quality of metal could differ greatly from a common soldier, whose armour could have only a thin soft sheet of metal, to an officer's brigandine, made of thin but tough and elastic steel. After the conquest of China and peace was established in the majority of the empire, many soldiers became lazy and refused to wear armour. In the 18th century, the Qianlong Emperor said, "Our old Manchu customs respect righteousness and revere justice. Young and old, none are ashamed to fight for them. But after enjoying such a long period of peace, inevitably, people want to avoid putting on armor and joining the ranks of war." As early as the 18th century, some brigandine armour had parts that were studded but did not actually include plates. By the 19th century most Qing armour were purely for show. Some uniforms and show pieces imitated brigandine armour by keeping the outer studs for aesthetic purposes but omitted the protective iron plates on the inside. According to one English source in the late 19th century, only the emperor's immediate body guard wore armour of any kind, and these guards were all nobles of the imperial family.

English literature in the early 19th century mentions Chinese rattan shields that were "almost musket proof", however another English source in the late 19th century states that they did nothing to protect their users during an advance on a Muslim stronghold, in which they were all invariably shot to death.

See also 
 Chinese swords
 Chinese polearms
 Japanese armour
 Korean armour
 Tibetan armor
 Indian armour

References

Citations

Works cited 

 .
 

 Peers, C. J. Imperial Chinese Armies (1): 200 BC-AD 589; illustrated by Michael Perry, Osprey Publishing «Men-at-arms»,  
 --do.--Imperial Chinese Armies (2): 590-1260 AD; illustrated by Michael Perry, Osprey Publishing «Men-at-arms»,  
 --do.--Medieval Chinese Armies: 1260-1520; illustrated by David Sque, Osprey Publishing «Men-at-arms»,  
 --do.--Late Imperial Chinese Armies: 1520-1840; illustrated by Christa Hook, Osprey Publishing «Men-at-arms», 
--do.--Ancient Chinese Armies: 1500-200B; illustrated by Angus McBridge, Osprey Publishing «Men-at-arms»,

External links
Brigandine pictures.
Video Evolution of Chinese Armor by Dynasty.

East Asian armour
Military history of China
Military equipment of China